Leonardo Deplano (born 21 July 1999) is an Italian swimmer. He competed in the 2021 FINA World Swimming Championships (25 m), winning gold in the men's 4 × 50 metre freestyle relay event.

At the 2022 European Aquatics Championships, held in Rome in August, Deplano won the silver medal in the 50 metre freestyle with a time of 21.60 seconds, finishing 0.02 seconds behind gold medalist Ben Proud of Great Britain.

References

External links
 

1999 births
Living people
Italian male freestyle swimmers
Sportspeople from Florence
Medalists at the FINA World Swimming Championships (25 m)
European Aquatics Championships medalists in swimming
21st-century Italian people